Henry de Vere Stacpoole (9 April 1863 – 12 April 1951) was an Irish author. His best-known work is the 1908 romance novel The Blue Lagoon, which has been adapted into multiple films. He published using his own name and sometimes the pseudonym Tyler de Saix.

Biography

He was born in Kingstown—today's Dún Laoghaire—in Taney, near Dublin, on April 9, 1863; He was the last son of the Reverend William Church Stacpoole, theologian and principal of Kingstown School, and Charlotte Augusta (née Mountjoy). He had three older sisters: the eldest was Florence Stacpoole, who wrote books and pamphlets on health and medicine. Henry attributed his love for nature which characterized his entire existence to the influence of his mother, who was of Irish origin but had spent her childhood until the age of twelve in the wildest and most wooded regions of Canada until she became a widow and decided to return to Ireland. Reverend William died prematurely in 1870 and the mother raised her four children alone. Due to breathing problems that were misdiagnosed, the family moved for a long stay, in the winter of 1871, in the south of France, to Nice.

He was educated at Portarlington Boarding School in Ireland 100 miles from Kingstown. It was not a happy experience; in the autobiographical Men and Mice he wrote about the fact that his noisy and rough companions abused him physically and mentally making him feel like "a little [King] Arthur in a cage of baboons". One night he fled, through an adjacent girls' school, but his older sister dragged him back to boarding school.

After moving his family to London, he enrolled at Malvern College in Worcestershire, a progressive school with a student class that finally met his expectations. He studied medicine at the St George's and St Mary's hospitals and became a doctor in 1891 despite being attracted much more to literature than to anatomy classes. He practised only sporadically, first as a doctor aboard a layout ship.

As a young man he befriended Pearl Craigie (known as John Oliver Hobbes) and this facilitated his first publication, a poem about Belgravia. In 1890 he met Aubrey Beardsley, Alfred Noyes and other writers and artists of the Yellow Book group. This environment influenced his first novel, The Intended (1894), a tragic novel about two look-alikes, one rich and the other poor, who exchange places for fun; but it had very little success. His second, Pierrot! (1896), is set during the Franco-Prussian War and deals with an ambiguous relationship between a boy French with his look-alike who acts as a psychic double, who then takes the form of a Prussian officer; all through a story of "family curses" for which it appears that the young French may be parricide. Hobbes recommended a lighter approach to the subject. Years later, Stacpoole told this story in The Man Who Lost Himself (1918); a penniless American who impersonates his rich lookalike in England; and this time it was a commercial success. It was followed by Death, the Knight, and the Lady (1897), a powerful mix of reincarnation, disguise, and uxoricide. The originality of the themes and the development was beyond doubt, but the audience was certainly not prepared. These novels, and The Rapin (1899), all failed commercially.

Stacpoole in these early works tries to develop a vision of existence for which the body is a "shell" – "chrysalis" he often says in these texts – waiting for a potential "charmer" that allows him to "divide" so that this existence can be shared by several bodies.

In the summer of 1898, Stacpoole practised as a country doctor in Somerset and wrote The Doctor (1899), a novel about English village life centred on an old doctor and a niece French who comes to upset his routine. Stacpoole considered this work his best work, but also this time the success of the public and critics was very modest.

By the early 1900s, Stacpoole had become a permanent professional writer; in an interview, he claimed that he wrote 2000 words a day and that his main sources of inspiration were Edgar Allan Poe, Victor Hugo, Eugène Sue and Robert Louis Stevenson.

He would be spared the "storm of success" for another seven years, during which time he published seven books, including a collection of children's stories and two novels in collaboration with his friend William Alexander Bryce. In 1904 he enlisted the assistance of the Royal Literary Fund the fact that sciatica and nervous depression prevented him from writing.

Public success came, however, in 1905 with a comic-romantic novel, Fanny Lambert, and in 1907 with a sea adventure, Crimson Azaleas; in the latter two rude sailors adopt a Japanese orphan. He also wrote articles and novels for periodicals, particularly for the Daily Express.

Still practising as a doctor, on 17 December 1907 he married Margaret Ann Robson, at St Stephen's Church, Westbourne Park. At that time he resided in Eden Vue, Langtivathby, Cumberland, where he practised medicine. After the wedding, the couple moved to Stebbing, Essex, where Stacpoole met H.G. Wells and served as a justice of the peace.

Stacpoole's greatest commercial success came in 1908 with The Blue Lagoon, which was reprinted at least twenty-four times in thirteen years, and from which films were made in 1923, 1949 and 1980. The Blue Lagoon is the story of two cousins, Dicky and Emmeline Lestrange, stranded on a remote island with a beautiful lagoon. As children, they are cared for by Paddy Button, a corpulent sailor who drinks until he dies after only two and a half years. Frightened and confused by the macabre vision of the sailor's corpse, the children flee to another part of Palm Tree Island. Five years pass and eventually fall in love. Sex and birth are as mysterious to them as death, but they manage to instinctively copulate and conceive a child. The story of the birth of her little son is interesting: the fifteen-year-old Emmeline, alone in the jungle, loses consciousness and wakes up to find a boy on the ground near her. Calling the child Hannah (an example of Stacpoole's penchant for gender reversals), the Lestranges live in family bliss until they are unexpectedly expelled from their tropical Eden.

The book belongs to a genre of psychological and sentimental fantasy centred on childhood, a genre that had become popular in Edwardian literature thanks to the success of The Wonderful Wizard of Oz by L. Frank Baum (1900), Peter Pan by J. M. Barrie (1904) and L'oiseau bleu by Maurice Maeterlinck (1908). But the references to Lewis Carroll's Alice's Adventures in Wonderland and the Book of Genesis are also obvious. In turn, The Blue Lagoon has probably stimulated the fashion of the island novel in popular fiction, as the author himself stated in a complaint for copyright infringement. It was also a high influence on Edgar Rice Burroughs' Tarzan of the Apes. Although Stacpoole stated in a 1921 interview that he was not interested in sequels, he wrote two: The Garden of God (1923) and The Gates of Morning (1925). The stage version, written by Norman MacOwan and Charlton Mann, was staged at the Prince of Wales Theatre in August 1920 and ran for eight months; the 12-year delay from the novel's release was caused by a rights dispute with the original publisher, T. F. Unwin. In 1933 the three novels were collected in The Blue Lagoon Omnibus.

Stacpoole's popularity after The Blue Lagoon grew enormously. In his long career, he wrote over sixty books, mainly fiction. His books were regularly published in America, had many translations into major European languages, and were reprinted without interruption for four or five decades. The settings varied widely (among others, ancient Athens, Iceland, the Greek islands and France), a variety that reflects a life of travel that began in childhood.

He published some works under the pseudonym Tyler de Saix, including The Vulture's Prey (1909). A moving depiction of Belgian atrocities in the Congo, The Pools of Silence (1910), was the result of a trip to Africa; after reading this work Sir Arthur Conan Doyle was induced to organize a conference to discuss these atrocities and make them as public as possible.

During World War I Stacpoole and his wife left Stebbing and moved to Astle House, Castle Hedingham. Shortly before 1920, they moved to London; his neighbour was the scholar Arthur S. Way, who induced him to undertake the translation of Sappho's poems. He moved to Cliff Dene, Bonchurch, Isle of Wight, in November 1922; the description of these places is in The Story of my Village (1947). We also have the same setting in Goblin Market (1925), a delicate social and psychological novel starring a middle-aged man. In 1922 Stacpoole published several volumes of verse, including his translations of Sappho and François Villon (of whom he also wrote a popular biography). After Margaret died in 1934, he gave the village of Bonchurch a pond and a bird "sanctuary" in her memory. On March 21, 1938, he married Margaret's sister, Florence Robson. He had no children from either marriage.

His love of nature led him to establish the Penguin Club, dedicated to saving seabirds from the "threat of oil", a cause that had engaged him since the 1920s. Stacpoole continued to write in the 1940s, based on romantic treasure hunt stories, with the notable exception of two fascinating sentimental memoirs, Men and Mice (1942) and More Men and Mice (1945). Together with Conan Doyle, he was inclined to believe in the existence of fairies following the events of Cottingley in the 20s where the fairies were photographed by the girls Elsie and Frances. Stacpoole was of robust constitution, tall and with a cheerful character and typically representative of Irish genius.

He died in a hospital in Shanklin, Isle of Wight, on 12 April 1951 of cerebral thrombosis, following surgery, and was buried at St Boniface Church, Bonchurch.

Works 

The Intended: A Novel (1894)
Pierrot! A Story (novel) (1895)
Death, the Knight, and the Lady: A Ghost Story (novel) (1897)
The Doctor: A Study from Life (novel) (1899)
The Rapin (novel) (1899).  Republished as Toto: A Parisian Sketch (1910).
The Bourgeois (1901)
The Lady-Killer (1902)
Fanny Lambert: A Novel (1906)
The Golden Astrolabe, co-authored by W. A. Bryce (1906).
The Meddler: A Novel of Sorts, co-authored by W. A. Bryce (1907).
The Crimson Azaleas: A Novel (1908)
The Blue Lagoon (novel) (1908)
The Cottage on the Fells (novel) (1908).  Republished as Murder on the Fell (1937)
Patsy: A Story (novel) (1908)
The Reavers: A Tale of Wild Adventure on the Moors of Lorne, co-authored by W. A. Bryce (1908)
The Man Without a Head, using the pseudonym Tyler De Saix (1908)
The Vulture's Prey, using the pseudonym Tyler De Saix (1908)
Garryowen: The Romance of a Race-Horse (novel) (1909)
The Pools of Silence (novel) (1909)
The Cruise of the King Fisher: A Tale of Deep-Sea Adventure (1910)
The Drums of War (1910)
Poems and Ballads (collection) (1910)
The Ship of Coral: A Tropical Romance (1911)
The Order of Release (1912)
The Street of the Flute-Player: A Romance (novel) (1912)
Molly Beamish (1913)
Bird Cay (1913)
The Children of the Sea: A Romance (1913)
Father O'Flynn (1914)
Feyshad (short children's story) (unknown), included in Poppyland (1914)
The Little Prince (children's story) (unknown), included in Poppyland (1914)
Pierrette (children's stories) (1900), republished as Poppyland (1914)
The Story of Abdul and Hafiz (short children's story) (unknown), included in Poppyland (1914)
The Poems of François Villon (translations) (1914)
Monsieur de Rochefort: A Romance of Old Paris (1914), published in the US as The Presentation (1914)
The New Optimism (1914)
The Blue Horizon: Romance from the Tropics and the Sea (1915)
The North Sea and Other Poems (1915)
The Pearl Fishers (1915)
The Red Day (fictional diary) (1915)
The Reef of Stars: A Romance of the Tropics (1916), published in the US as The Gold Trail (1916)
Corporal Jacques of the Foreign Legion (1916)
François Villon: His Life and Times, 1431-1463 (literary biography) (1916)
In Blue Waters (1917)
Sea Plunder (1917)
The Starlit Garden: A Romance of the South (1917), published in the US as The Ghost Girl (1918)
The Willow Tree: The Romance of a Japanese Garden (1918)
The Man Who Lost Himself (novel) (1918)
The Beach of Dreams: A Story of the True World (1919)
Under Blue Skies (1919)
Sappho: A New Rendering (translations) (1920)
A Man of the Islands (1920)
Uncle Simon, co-authored by Margaret Stacpoole (1920), published in the US as The Man Who Found Himself (1920)
Satan: A Story of the Sea King's Country (1921)
Satan: A Romance of the Bahamas (1921), filmed as The Truth About Spring (1965)
Men, Women, and Beasts (1922)
Vanderdecken: The Story of a Man (1922)
The Garden of God (1923) (sequel to The Blue Lagoon)
Golden Ballast (1924)
Ocean Tramps (1924)
The House of Crimson Shadows: A Romance (1925)
The Gates of Morning (1925) (sequel to The Garden of God)
The City in the Sea (1925)
Stories East and West: Tales of Men and Women (1926)
The Mystery of Uncle Bollard (1927)
Goblin Market: A Romance (novel) (1927)
Tropic Love (1928)
Roxanne (1928), published in the US as The Return of Spring (1928)
Eileen of the Trees (1929)
The Girl of the Golden Reef: A Romance of the Blue Lagoon (1929)
The Tales of Mynheer Amayat (1930)
The Chank Shell: A Tropical Romance of Love and Treasure (1930), published in the US as The Island of Lost Women (1930).
Pacific Gold (1931)
Love on the Adriatic (1932)
The Lost Caravan (1932)
Mandarin Gardens (1933)
The Naked Soul: The Story of a Modern Knight (1933)
The Blue Lagoon Omnibus (1933)
The Vengeance of Mynheer Van Lok and Other Stories (1934)
The Longshore Girl: A Romance (novel) (1935)
Green Coral (a collection of stories) (1935)
The Sunstone (1936)
In a Bonchurch Garden: Poems and Translations (1937)
Ginger Adams (1937)
High-Yaller (1938)
Old Sailors Never Lie and Other Tales of Land and Sea by One of Them (1938)
Due East of Friday (1939)
An American at Oxford (1941)
Men and Mice, 1863–1942 (autobiography) (1942)
Oxford Goes to War: A Novel (1943)
More Men and Mice (autobiography) (1945)
Harley Street: A Novel (1946)
The Story of My Village (novel) (1947)
The Land of Little Horses. A Story (novel) (1949)
The Man in Armour (novel) (1949)

Adaptations of Stacpoole's books

Stage 
 The Blue Lagoon by Norman MacOwan and Charlton Mann (1920)

Motion pictures 
 Garryowen (1920)
 The Man Who Lost Himself (1920)
 Beach of Dreams (1921)
 The Blue Lagoon (1923)
 The Starlit Garden (1923)
 Satan's Sister (1925)
 The Man Who Lost Himself (1941)
 The Blue Lagoon (1949)
 The Truth About Spring (1965)
 The Blue Lagoon (1980)
 Return to the Blue Lagoon (1991)
 Blue Lagoon: The Awakening (2012)

References 
E. A. Malone, "H. de Vere Stacpoole", Dictionary of Literary Biography, Volume 153: Late-Victorian and Edwardian British Novelists, First Series, edited by G. M. Johnson, Detroit: Gale, 1995, pp. 278–287.
R. F. Hardin, "The Man Who Wrote The Blue Lagoon: Stacpoole's Pastoral Center", English Literature in Transition (1880–1920), vol. 39, no. 2, 1996, pp. 205–20.
C. Deméocq, "Henry de Vere Stacpoole aux Kerguelen", Carnets de l'Exotisme, vol. 17–18, 1996, pp. 151–52.

External links

 
 
 
 
 
 
 Henry De Vere Stacpoole. The Malvern Register 1865–1905, p. 150.
 
 
 Henry De Vere Stacpoole Collection at the Harry Ransom Center

1863 births
1951 deaths
19th-century English male writers
19th-century English novelists
19th-century Irish medical doctors
19th-century pseudonymous writers
20th-century English male writers
20th-century English novelists
20th-century Irish male writers
20th-century pseudonymous writers
British male novelists
Irish novelists
Irish male writers
People from County Dublin
People from Dún Laoghaire
People from the Isle of Wight
People of the Victorian era